Rift Valley fever (RVF) is a viral disease of humans and livestock that can cause mild to severe symptoms. The mild symptoms may include: fever, muscle pains, and headaches which often last for up to a week. The severe symptoms may include: loss of sight beginning three weeks after the infection, infections of the brain causing severe headaches and confusion, and bleeding together with liver problems which may occur within the first few days. Those who have bleeding have a chance of death as high as 50%.

The disease is caused by the RVF virus. It is spread by either touching infected animal blood, breathing in the air around an infected animal being butchered, drinking raw milk from an infected animal, or the bite of infected mosquitoes. Animals such as cows, sheep, goats, and camels may be affected. In these animals it is spread mostly by mosquitoes. It does not appear that one person can infect another person. The disease is diagnosed by finding antibodies against the virus or the virus itself in the blood.

Prevention of the disease in humans is accomplished by vaccinating animals against the disease. This must be done before an outbreak occurs because if it is done during an outbreak it may worsen the situation. Stopping the movement of animals during an outbreak may also be useful, as may decreasing mosquito numbers and avoiding their bites. There is a human vaccine; however, as of 2010 it is not widely available. There is no specific treatment and medical efforts are supportive.

Outbreaks of the disease have only occurred in Africa and Arabia. Outbreaks usually occur during periods of increased rain which increase the number of mosquitoes. The disease was first reported among livestock in Rift Valley of Kenya in the early 1900s, and the virus was first isolated in 1931.

Signs and symptoms
In humans, the virus can cause several syndromes. Usually, they have either no symptoms or only a mild illness with fever, headache, muscle pains, and liver abnormalities. In a small percentage of cases (< 2%), the illness can progress to hemorrhagic fever syndrome, meningoencephalitis (inflammation of the brain and tissues lining the brain), or affect the eye. Patients who become ill usually experience fever, generalised weakness, back pain, dizziness, and weight loss at the onset of the illness. Typically, people recover within two to seven days after onset. About 1% of people with the disease die of it. In livestock, the fatality level is significantly higher. Pregnant livestock infected with RVF abort virtually 100% of foetuses. An epizootic (animal disease epidemic) of RVF is usually first indicated by a wave of unexplained abortions.

Other signs in livestock include vomiting and diarrhoea, respiratory disease, fever, lethargy, anorexia and sudden death in young animals.

Cause

Virology

The virus belongs to the Bunyavirales order. This is an order of enveloped negative single stranded RNA viruses. All Bunyaviruses have an outer lipid envelope with two glycoproteins—G(N) and G(C)—required for cell entry. They deliver their genome into the host-cell cytoplasm by fusing their envelope with an endosomal membrane.

The virus' G(C) protein has a class II membrane fusion protein architecture similar to that found in flaviviruses and alphaviruses. This structural similarity suggests that there may be a common origin for these viral families.

The virus' 11.5 kb tripartite genome is composed of single-stranded RNA. As a Phlebovirus, it has an ambisense genome. Its L and M segments are negative-sense, but its S segment is ambisense. These three genome segments code for six major proteins: L protein (viral polymerase), the two glycoproteins G(N) and G(C), the nucleocapsid N protein, and the nonstructural NSs and NSm proteins.

Transmission

The virus is transmitted through mosquito vectors, as well as through contact with the tissue of infected animals. Two species—Culex tritaeniorhynchus and Aedes vexans—are known to transmit the virus. Other potential vectors include Aedes caspius, Aedes mcintosh, Aedes ochraceus, Culex pipiens, Culex antennatus, Culex perexiguus, Culex zombaensis and Culex quinquefasciatus. Contact with infected tissue is considered to be the main source of human infections. The virus has been isolated from two bat species: the Peter's epauletted fruit bat (Micropteropus pusillus) and the aba roundleaf bat (Hipposideros abae), which are believed to be reservoirs for the virus.

Pathogenesis 
Although many components of the RVFV's RNA play an important role in the virus' pathology, the nonstructural protein encoded on the S segment (NSs) is the only component that has been found to directly affect the host. NSs is hostile and combative against the host interferon (IFNs) antiviral response. IFNs are essential in order for the immune system to fight off viral infections in a host. This inhibitory mechanism is believed to be due to a number of reasons, the first being, competitive inhibition of the formation of the transcription factor. On this transcription factor, NSs interacts with and binds to a subunit that is needed for RNA polymerase I and II. This interaction cause competitive inhibition with another transcription factor component and prevents the assembly process of the transcription factor complex, which results in the suppression of the host antiviral response. Transcription suppression is believed to be another mechanism of this inhibitory process. This occurs when an area of NSs interacts with and binds to the host's protein, SAP30 and forms a complex. This complex causes histone acetylation to regress, which is needed for transcriptional activation of the IFN promoter. This causes IFN expression to be obstructed. Lastly, NSs has also been known to affect regular activity of double-stranded RNA-dependent protein kinase R. This protein is involved in cellular antiviral responses in the host. When RVFV is able to enter the host's DNA, NSs forms a filamentous structure in the nucleus. This allows the virus to interact with specific areas of the host's DNA that relates to segregation defects and induction of chromosome continuity. This increases host infectivity and decreases the host's antiviral response.

Diagnosis
Diagnosis relies on viral isolation from tissues, or serological testing with an ELISA. Other methods of diagnosis include Nucleic Acid Testing (NAT), cell culture, and IgM antibody assays. As of September 2016, the Kenya Medical Research Institute (KEMRI) has developed a product called Immunoline, designed to diagnose the disease in humans much faster than in previous methods.

Prevention

A person's chances of becoming infected can be reduced by taking measures to decrease contact with blood, body fluids, or tissues of infected animals and protection against mosquitoes and other bloodsucking insects. Use of mosquito repellents and bed nets are two effective methods. For persons working with animals in RVF-endemic areas, wearing protective equipment to avoid any exposure to blood or tissues of animals that may potentially be infected is an important protective measure. Potentially, establishing environmental monitoring and case surveillance systems may aid in the prediction and control of future RVF outbreaks.

No vaccines are currently available for humans. While a vaccines have been developed for humans, it has only been used experimentally for scientific personnel in high-risk environments. Trials of a number of vaccines, such as NDBR-103 and TSI-GSD 200, are ongoing. Different types of vaccines for veterinary use are available. The killed vaccines are not practical in routine animal field vaccination because of the need of multiple injections. Live vaccines require a single injection but are known to cause birth defects and abortions in sheep and induce only low-level protection in cattle. The live-attenuated vaccine, MP-12, has demonstrated promising results in laboratory trials in domesticated animals, but more research is needed before the vaccine can be used in the field. The live-attenuated clone 13 vaccine was recently registered and used in South Africa. Alternative vaccines using molecular recombinant constructs are in development and show promising results.

A vaccine has been conditionally approved for use in animals in the US. It has been shown that knockout of the NSs and NSm nonstructural proteins of this virus produces an effective vaccine in sheep as well.

Epidemiology

RVF outbreaks occur across sub-Saharan Africa, with outbreaks occurring elsewhere infrequently. Outbreaks of this disease usually correspond with the warm phases of the EI Niño/Southern Oscillation. During this time there is an increase in rainfall, flooding and greenness of vegetation index, which leads to an increase in mosquito vectors. RVFV can be transmitted vertically in mosquitos, meaning that the virus can be passed from the mother to her offspring. During dry conditions, the virus can remain viable for a number of years in the egg. Mosquitos lay their eggs in water, where they eventually hatch. As water is essential for mosquito eggs to hatch, rainfall and flooding cause an increase in the mosquito population and an increased potential for the virus.

The first documented outbreak was identified in Kenya in 1931, in sheep, cattle and humans; another severe outbreak in the country in 1950–1951 involved 100,000 deaths in livestock and an unrecorded number of humans with fever. An outbreak occurred in South Africa in 1974–1976, with more than 500,000 infected animals and the first deaths in humans. In Egypt in 1977–78, an estimated 200,000 people were infected and there were at least 594 deaths. In Kenya in 1998, the virus killed more than 400 people. Since then, there have been outbreaks in Saudi Arabia and Yemen (2000), East Africa (2006–2007), Sudan (2007), South Africa (2010), Uganda (2016), Kenya (2018), and Mayotte (2018–2019). 2020–2021 in Kenya, in 2022 an outbreak is ongoing in Burundi.

Biological weapon
Rift Valley fever was one of more than a dozen agents that the United States researched as potential biological weapons before the nation suspended its biological weapons program in 1969.

Research
The disease is one of several identified by WHO as a likely cause of a future epidemic in a new plan developed after the Ebola epidemic for urgent research and development toward new diagnostic tests, vaccines and medicines.

See also

 Coalition for Epidemic Preparedness Innovations

References

External links 
 CDC RVF Information Page
 Rift Valley Fever disease card at OIE
 
 

Arthropod-borne viral fevers and viral haemorrhagic fevers
Tropical diseases
Zoonoses
Insect-borne diseases
Sheep and goat diseases
Biological weapons
Virus-related cutaneous conditions
Wikipedia medicine articles ready to translate
Wikipedia infectious disease articles ready to translate
Biological anti-agriculture weapons